Thomas Milton Gatch (January 28, 1833 – April 23, 1913) was an American educator and politician in Oregon. He served one term as mayor of Salem, Oregon, was the president of what would become Oregon State University, served as president of the University of Washington, and twice served as president of Willamette University. A native of Ohio, he was the first president of Oregon State University to hold a doctorate degree.

Early life
Thomas Gatch was born in the town of Milford, Ohio, to Lucinda and Thomas Gatch. In Ohio, Gatch attended Ohio Wesleyan University where he graduated with a Bachelor of Arts degree in 1855. He then moved to Cincinnati, where he took a course at Lane Theological Seminary, and was later awarded an honorary Doctor of Divinity degree from the school.

Educational career
In 1856 Gatch moved west to California, where he mined gold during the California Gold Rush and also taught school for three years. He then taught at the University of the Pacific at Santa Clara, California. At Pacific he served as chair of the natural sciences and mathematics department. He was married in 1857 to Orytha Bennett, and they would have five children including Claude Gatch, who would become mayor of Salem. Claud's son Thomas Leigh Gatch, commanded the battleship  and served as Judge Advocate General of the United States Navy during World War II.

In 1859, Thomas Gatch moved to Olympia, Washington, where he worked as the principal of Puget Sound Wesleyan Institute. The following year, he was appointed as president of Willamette University in Salem, where he served until 1865. He returned to the position as president of the school, serving from 1870 until 1879. During this time Thomas Gatch then earned a Doctor of Philosophy in 1874 from Indiana Asbury University (now DePauw University). He also served as mayor of Salem from 1877 to 1878.

From 1879 until 1881 he was a professor of history at the University of Oregon in Eugene; afterwards he helped found the Wasco Independent Academy in The Dalles, Oregon in 1881. Gatch served as president of that institution until 1886. Gatch was then selected to serve as president of the University of Washington in Seattle in 1887. In 1895 he left the school, and in 1897 he was appointed to the position of president of Oregon Agricultural College (now Oregon State University). While at Oregon State he was also a professor of political and mental science, and was the first president of the school to hold a doctorate degree. Gatch served at the Corvallis school until July 1907 when he resigned as president, though continued teaching until the end of the year.

Later years
After leaving Oregon State in 1907, he returned to his home in Seattle, Washington. Thomas Milton Gatch died in Seattle on April 23, 1913.

References

1833 births
1913 deaths
19th-century American politicians
DePauw University alumni
Educators from Cincinnati
Lane Theological Seminary alumni
Mayors of Salem, Oregon
Ohio Wesleyan University alumni
People from Milford, Ohio
Presidents of Oregon State University
Presidents of the University of Washington
Presidents of Willamette University
University of the Pacific (United States) faculty